Ailish Smyth (born 18 September 1958) is an Irish long-distance runner. She competed in the women's marathon at the 1988 Summer Olympics.

References

1958 births
Living people
Athletes (track and field) at the 1988 Summer Olympics
Irish female long-distance runners
Irish female marathon runners
Olympic athletes of Ireland
Place of birth missing (living people)